Jesinoski v. Countrywide Home Loans, Inc., 574 U.S. 259 (2015), was a United States Supreme Court case in which the Court held that the Truth in Lending Act does not require borrowers to file a lawsuit to rescind loans and that sending written notice is sufficient to effectuate rescission. Some commentators described Justice Antonin Scalia's unanimous majority opinion as "terse" and the "shortest opinion of the year". Other analysts have described Jesinoski as a "landmark case" in Truth in Lending Act jurisprudence.

Background

Truth in Lending Act rescission requirements
In 1968, Congress passed the Truth in Lending Act to help consumers "avoid the uninformed use of credit, and to protect the consumer against inaccurate and unfair credit billing." The Act gives borrowers the unconditional right to rescind loans within three days of consummation of the loan, after which they may rescind only if the lender failed to satisfy the Act’s disclosure requirements. However, even if lenders never provide the required disclosures, borrowers only retain the right to rescind loans up to three years after the loan's consummation.

Initial lawsuit
On February 23, 2010, exactly three years after borrowing $611,000 from Countrywide Home Loans, Inc. to refinance the mortgage on their home, Larry and Cheryle Jesinoski mailed a letter to Countrywide to rescind the loan agreement. On March 12, 2010, Bank of America Home Loans sent a reply letter in which they refused to acknowledge the validity of the rescission. The Jesinoskis filed suit in federal district court on February 24, 2011 seeking a declaration of rescission and damages. The district court ruled in favor of Bank of America and concluded that the Truth in Lending Act requires borrowers seeking rescission of a loan to file a lawsuit within three years of consummating the loan. Because the Jesinoskis filed their lawsuit four years after the loan's consummation, they were not entitled to rescission of the loan. The United States Court of Appeals for the Eighth Circuit upheld the decision of the district court. The Jesinoskis appealed again, and the Supreme Court granted certiorari on April 28, 2014.

Opinion of the Court

Writing for a unanimous court, Justice Antonin Scalia ruled that the Truth in Lending Act does not require borrowers to file a lawsuit to effectuate rescission. Justice Scalia stated that the plain language of the act "leaves no doubt that rescission is effected when the borrower notifies the creditor of his intention to rescind," but the act "says nothing about how that right is exercised." Although common law rules for rescission traditionally required "either that the rescinding party return what he received" or a court's "decree [of] rescission," Justice Scalia concluded that the Act did not adopt these common law requirements. Instead, he argued that "[n]othing in our jurisprudence, and no tool of statutory interpretation, requires that a congressional Act must be construed as implementing its closest common-law analogue." Consequently, the statute has effectively altered common law practice, and borrowers "need only provide written notice to a lender in order to exercise his right to rescind."

Commentary and analysis
After the Supreme Court issued its opinion, analysts described Jesinoski as a "landmark case" in Truth in Lending Act jurisprudence. Other commentators praised the court for "correctly read[ing]" the Truth in Lending Act "to mean what it says." Some analysts also described Justice Scalia's opinion as "terse" and the "shortest opinion of the year" with "only six paragraphs of analysis." Others predicted Justice Scalia's textualist approach in Jesinoski would foreshadow a similar analytic approach for the Court's decision in King v. Burwell.

See also

 List of United States Supreme Court cases
 List of United States Supreme Court cases, volume 574

Notes

References

Further reading
 Milan Prodanovic, Hiding in Plain Sight: Jesinoski and the Consumer's Right of Rescission, 10 Duke J. Const. L. & Pub. Pol'y 141 (2015).

External links
 

2015 in United States case law
United States Supreme Court cases
United States Supreme Court cases of the Roberts Court